Trichochaeta is a genus of flies in the family Stratiomyidae.

Species
Trichochaeta nemoteloides Bigot, 1878
Trichochaeta recedens (Walker, 1861)
Trichochaeta scapularis (Walker, 1861)

References

Stratiomyidae
Brachycera genera
Taxa named by Jacques-Marie-Frangile Bigot
Diptera of Asia
Diptera of Australasia